The 2020 Esiliiga was the 30th season of the Esiliiga, the second tier of Estonian football. The season started on 5 March 2020 and concluded on 29 November 2022.

Teams
A total of 10 teams contest in the league, including six sides from the 2019 season, one relegated from 2019 Meistriliiga and three promoted from the 2019 Esiliiga B.

League table

Results

Matches 1–18

Matches 19–32

Relegation play-offs

Pärnu Jalgpalliklubi won 8–2 on aggregate.

Season statistics

Top scorers

Awards

Monthly awards

Esiliiga Player of the Year
Kevin Mätas was named Esiliiga Player of the Year.

See also
 2019–20 Estonian Cup
 2020–21 Estonian Cup
 2020 Meistriliiga
 2020 Esiliiga B

References

Esiliiga seasons
2
Estonia
Estonia